Scarborough North is a provincial riding in Ontario, Canada. It was originally created prior to the 1963 provincial election and eliminated in 1996, when most of its territory was incorporated into the ridings of Scarborough—Agincourt and Scarborough—Rouge River.  For the 2018 provincial election, it was re-created from Scarborough—Agincourt and Scarborough—Rouge River.  Scarborough North riding was originally created from part of the former riding of York—Scarborough. It is in the former borough of Scarborough.

Two Members of Provincial Parliament represented the riding during its original existence. The most notable was Alvin Curling who served as Speaker of the Legislature.

Boundaries
The riding was created in 1963 through an amendment to the Representation Act. It formed the northwest part of the former riding of York—Scarborough. The riding was bordered by Lawrence Avenue to the south, Victoria Park Avenue to the west, Steeles Avenue to the north and Markham Road to the east.

In 1975, the boundary was significantly altered. The western boundary remained Victoria Park Avenue and the northern boundary of Steeles Avenue were retained. The eastern boundary was extended to the city limits at the edge of the Rouge River. The southern boundary was made as follows. Going east on Lawrence Avenue from Victoria Park Avenue it went to Birchmount Road. It headed north on Birchmount to Highway 401 and then continued east along the highway until it met the city limits.

In 1987 the boundary was altered again. The eastern border was shifted east to the CNR right-of-way east of Kennedy Road. The southern border became Highway 401 from the railway to the city limits. The northern and eastern borders remained the same.

Members of Provincial Parliament

Electoral results

2015 boundaries

1963 boundaries

1975 boundaries

1987 boundaries

References

Notes

Citations

External links
Map of riding for 2018 election

Provincial electoral districts of Toronto
Scarborough, Toronto